A biological system is a complex network which connects several biologically relevant entities. Biological organization spans several scales and are determined based different structures depending on what the system is. Examples of biological systems at the macro scale are populations of organisms. On the organ and tissue scale in mammals and other animals, examples include the circulatory system, the respiratory system, and the nervous system. On the micro to the nanoscopic scale, examples of biological systems are cells, organelles, macromolecular complexes and regulatory pathways. A biological system is not to be confused with a living system, such as a living organism.

Organ and tissue systems

These specific systems are widely studied in human anatomy and are also present in many other animals.

 Respiratory system: the organs used for breathing, the pharynx, larynx, bronchi, lungs and diaphragm.
 Digestive system: digestion and processing food with salivary glands, oesophagus, stomach, liver, gallbladder, pancreas, intestines, rectum and anus.
 Cardiovascular system (heart and circulatory system): pumping and channeling blood to and from the body and lungs with heart, blood and blood vessels.
 Urinary system: kidneys, ureters, bladder and urethra involved in fluid balance, electrolyte balance and excretion of urine.
 Integumentary system: skin, hair, fat, and nails.
 Skeletal system: structural support and protection with bones, cartilage, ligaments and tendons.
 Endocrine system: communication within the body using hormones made by endocrine glands such as the hypothalamus, pituitary gland, pineal body or pineal gland, thyroid, parathyroid and adrenals, i.e., adrenal glands.
 Lymphatic system: structures involved in the transfer of lymph between tissues and the blood stream; includes the lymph and the nodes and vessels. The lymphatic system includes functions including immune responses and development of antibodies.
 Immune system: protects the organism from foreign bodies.
 Nervous system: collecting, transferring and processing information with brain, spinal cord, peripheral nervous system and sense organs.
 Sensory systems: visual system, auditory system, olfactory system, gustatory system, somatosensory system, vestibular system.   
 Muscular system: allows for manipulation of the environment, provides locomotion, maintains posture, and produces heat. Includes skeletal muscles, smooth muscles and cardiac muscle.
 Reproductive system: the sex organs, such as ovaries, fallopian tubes, uterus, vagina, mammary glands, testes, vas deferens, seminal vesicles and prostate.

History
The notion of system (or apparatus) relies upon the concept of vital or organic function: a system is a set of organs with a definite function. This idea was already present in Antiquity (Galen, Aristotle), but the application of the term "system" is more recent. For example, the nervous system was named by Monro (1783), but Rufus of Ephesus (c. 90-120), clearly viewed for the first time the brain, spinal cord, and craniospinal nerves as an anatomical unit, although he wrote little about its function, nor gave a name to this unit.

The enumeration of the principal functions - and consequently of the systems - remained almost the same since Antiquity, but the classification of them has been very various, e.g., compare Aristotle, Bichat, Cuvier.

The notion of physiological division of labor, introduced in the 1820s by the French physiologist Henri Milne-Edwards, allowed to "compare and study living things as if they were machines created by the industry of man." Inspired in the work of Adam Smith, Milne-Edwards wrote that the "body of all living beings, whether animal or plant, resembles a factory ... where the organs, comparable to workers, work incessantly to produce the phenomena that constitute the life of the individual." In more differentiated organisms, the functional labor could be apportioned between different instruments or systems (called by him as appareils).

Cellular organelle systems 

The exact components of a cell are determined by whether the cell is a eukaryote or prokaryote.

 Nucleus (eukaryotic only): storage of genetic material; control center of the cell.
Cytosol: component of the cytoplasm consisting of jelly-like fluid in which organelles are suspended within
 Cell membrane (plasma membrane): 
 Endoplasmic reticulum: outer part of the nuclear envelope forming a continuous channel used for transportation; consists of the rough endoplasmic reticulum and the smooth endoplasmic reticulum
 Rough endoplasmic reticulum (RER): considered "rough" due to the ribosomes attached to the channeling; made up of cisternae that allow for protein production
 Smooth endoplasmic reticulum (SER): storage and synthesis of lipids and steroid hormones as well as detoxification
 Ribosome: site of biological protein synthesis essential for internal activity and cannot be reproduced in other organs 
 Mitochondrion (mitochondria): powerhouse of the cell; site of cellular respiration producing ATP (adenosine triphosphate) 
 Lysosome: center of breakdown for unwanted/unneeded material within the cell
 Peroxisome: breaks down toxic materials from the contained digestive enzymes such as H2O2(hydrogen peroxide)
Golgi apparatus (eukaryotic only): folded network involved in modification, transport, and secretion 
Chloroplast: site of photosynthesis; storage of chlorophyll

See also

 Biological network
 Artificial life
 Biological systems engineering
 Evolutionary systems
 Systems biology
 Systems ecology
 Systems theory

External links
 Systems Biology: An Overview by Mario Jardon: A review from the Science Creative Quarterly, 2005.
 Synthesis and Analysis of a Biological System, by Hiroyuki Kurata, 1999.
It from bit and fit from bit.  On the origin and impact of information in the average evolution.   Includes how life forms and biological systems originate and from there  evolve to become more and more complex, including evolution of genes and memes, into the complex memetics from organisations and multinational corporations and a "global brain", (Yves Decadt, 2000). Book published in Dutch with English paper summary in The Information Philosopher, http://www.informationphilosopher.com/solutions/scientists/decadt/
 Schmidt-Rhaesa, A. 2007. The Evolution of Organ Systems. Oxford University Press, Oxford, .

References

Biological systems